The Konkouré River arises in west-central Guinea and flows into the Atlantic Ocean. Several dams on the river provide the country with much of its electricity.

The river originates in the Futa Jallon highland region and flows in a westerly direction  to the Atlantic Ocean north of the Baie de Sangareya (Sangareya Bay) at 9°46'N, 14°19'W. The Kakrima River is its major tributary. The "Lower Konkouré is a shallow, funnel shaped, mesotidal, mangrove-fringed, tide dominated estuary". Rice farms have been established in the mangrove areas of the delta "with some success".

In 1999, the Garafiri Dam was opened at a cost of $221 million; it can produce  of electricity. In 2015, the central government contracted with Chinese firms to begin building a  dam (the Souapiti Hydropower Station), near Souapiti, about  further upstream, which would almost double Guinea's power generation output at an estimated cost of $2 billion. This would, however, require that 15,000 people move out of what would become a flood plain.

The river is home to 96 recorded freshwater fish species.

Vessels of up to  draft can navigate upstream to Konkouré; beyond that point, there are rapids.

References

Rivers of Guinea